Maíla Paula Machado (born 22 January 1981 in Limeira) is a Brazilian athlete specializing in the 100 metres hurdles event. She competed twice at the Olympic Games, in 2004 in Athens and in 2008 in Beijing, both times failing to progress to the second round.

Her indoor 60 metres hurdles personal best of 8.08 is the current South American record.

Competition record

Personal bests
Outdoors
100m – 12.25 (+0.4 m/s) (Hamburg 2002)
110m hurdles – 12.86 (+0.2 m/s) (São Paulo 2004)

Indoors
60m hurdles – 8.08 (Moscow 2006)

External links
IAAF profile

1981 births
Living people
Brazilian female hurdlers
Athletes (track and field) at the 2004 Summer Olympics
Athletes (track and field) at the 2008 Summer Olympics
Athletes (track and field) at the 2016 Summer Olympics
Athletes (track and field) at the 2003 Pan American Games
Athletes (track and field) at the 2011 Pan American Games
Olympic athletes of Brazil
Universiade medalists in athletics (track and field)
People from Limeira
Universiade silver medalists for Brazil
Medalists at the 2001 Summer Universiade
Pan American Games athletes for Brazil
Sportspeople from São Paulo (state)
21st-century Brazilian women
20th-century Brazilian women